Kuthiran is a mountainous terrain in Thrissur district of Kerala state, south India. It is located on the banks of Manali river, which has its source in the nearby mountains. It is in between Thrissur and Palakkad. There is a famous Ayyappan Temple located here by the side of the highway. It is in the NH544 highway. This place is  known for Kuthiran Tunnel that shortens travel time between Thrissur and Palakkad districts.

Kuthiran is infamous for the bad condition of the National Highway. Accidents are very common across this stretch.

Recent news clips show that people traveling between Trichur and Palakkad are choosing alternate roads like the Trichur-Shoranur-Ottapalam-Palakkad.

See also
 Kuthiran Tunnel

References

External links

Cities and towns in Thrissur district